Ralph Joseph Lim (born 8 November 1999), also known as R-Ji, is a Filipino singer, actor and model. He is the waray-waray representative of the P-pop group, Alamat.

Early life
Lim was born on November 8, 1999, in Borongan, the capital city of the province of Eastern Samar, Philippines. At the age of 9, his father died, leaving his mother Dolores Baleña-Lim, to financially support him. He studied at Eastern Samar National Comprehensive High School where he also joined various school pageantry and talent competitions.

He is Roman Catholic and formerly a member of the Neocatechumenal Way.

Career

2020–present: Alamat
Lim started his musical career on November 5, 2020, when he was introduced to the public through the Alamat Facebook page as Trainee 5 with the codename Sangkay ("friend" in the waray-waray language). On February 14, 2021, after training for nine months, he debuted as an official member of Alamat with the name R-Ji in their debut single "kbye".

The Alamat boy group was formed through PWEDE: The National Boyband Search by VIVA Artists Agency and Ninuno Media. It distinguishes itself as a multilingual and multiethnic boy band that sings in seven Philippine languages: Tagalog, Ilocano, Kapampangan, Cebuano, Hiligaynon, Bikolano, and Waray-Waray.

Acting career
Lim played a minor role in Jason Paul Laxamana's 2022 film Expensive Candy, featuring Julia Barretto and Carlo Aquino.

Discography

As lead vocalist and visual in the Pinoy boyband, he appeared in the following musical singles:

Singles

References

External links

ALAMAT youtube.com
R-Ji (@alamat.rji) Instagram

1999 births
Living people
People from Borongan
Filipino male models
Filipino male dancers
Filipino male pop singers
21st-century Filipino male singers
Filipino Roman Catholics